Col. Isaac Allerton Jr. ( 1627/1630 – December 30, 1702) was planter, military officer, politician and merchant in colonial America. Like his father, he first traded in New England, and after his father's death, in Virginia. There, he served on the Governor's Council (1687-1691) and for many years in the House of Burgesses, representing Northumberland County and later Westmoreland County.

Early and family life
Born in Plymouth, Massachusetts, sometime after May 22, 1627, and before September 21, 1631 (since no birth record has been found), his father and grandfather were among the colony's leaders. His father  Isaac Allerton Sr. had emigrated to what was then known as the Plymouth Colony on the ship Mayflower, as a Pilgrim. His father's first wife, Mary Norris, had died the following winter, on February 25, 1621. Thus the younger Isaac Allerton had 3 half-siblings (all born in Leiden, Holland): Bartholomew, Remember and Mary, the last surviving passenger of the Mayflower.

His mother Fear Brewster, was the elder Allerton's second wife, and the daughter of Elder William Brewster. the colony's spiritual and political leader, who had also sailed aboard the Mayflower as well as signed the Mayflower Compact. Her mother was Mary Brewster, and Fear Brewster arrived at Plymouth, Massachusetts on July 10, 1623, aboard the Anne. Another passenger on the Anne was this man's aunt Sarah Allerton, who had married Degory Priest who had also arrived on the Mayflower and signed the Mayflower Compact. The widowed Sarah had married Priest in a dual wedding with Isaac Allerton Sr. and his first wife.

Fear Brewster Allerton died sometime before December 12, 1634. Disagreements with fellow Plymouth Colonists concerning his commingling his own merchant accounts with the colony's payments to the Merchant Adventurers for funding the Mayflower voyage increased after his second wife's death. Also, he had previously established a trading post in Maine, which interfered with the colony's monopoly on the fur trade and later with a British treaty. Thus, the elder Allerton moved south to the New Haven Colony. However, young Isaac did not initially join him. Instead he was raised by his maternal grandfather William Brewster, and eventually joined the family of his uncle Love Brewster. Meanwhile, by 1644, when elder Brewster died, the elder Isaac Allerton had again remarried, to his third wife, Joanna Swinnerton.

Education
His grandfather Brewster tutored young Isaac before he entered college. He graduated from Harvard College in Cambridge, Massachusetts in 1650.

Marriage and family
Allerton married twice. He married his first wife, Elizabeth (...) in New Haven, Connecticut in 1652–3. Before her death, they had two children, Elizabeth (1653–1740) and Isaac (1655-?). Elizabeth was born on September 27, 1653 in New Haven, Connecticut and first married Benjamin Starr, who was born in Yarmouth, Massachusetts, the grandson of Doctor Comfort Starr of Boston (who emigrated from Ashford, Kent and founded Cambridge, Massachusetts and Harvard College) and nephew of Hannah Starr, the wife of John Cutt (the first President of the Province of New Hampshire). Following Starr's early death, Elizabeth married his first cousin Simon Ayers (or Eyres or Eyre) of New Haven.

His son Isaac (the third of the name) was born at New Haven on June 11, 1655. He accompanied his father to Virginia when he was a child, but returned to New Haven about 1683 and lived there most of the remainder of his life.

In 1663, Allerton married as his second wife the twice-widowed Elizabeth Willoughby (Overzee) Colclough. They had three daughters and a son:

Career
Circa 1660, the widower moved his family to Virginia's Northern Neck. Initially he had settled in Wicomico in Gloucester County on waterfront land near the plantation of Col. Richard Lee II, who later served with him on the Governor's Council and invested in land further upstream on the Potomac River in what became Northumberland and Westmoreland Counties. Allerton and his descendants became wealthy as planters in Virginia, with indentured servants, and ultimately owned a  plantation on the south side of the Rappahannock River. As a tobacco planter-merchant Allerton probably constructed a wharf and warehouse (as his father had done in New Amsterdam) since financial success required both growing and transporting tobacco. Whether Allerton bought land from his neighbor Richard Lee II or acquired it over time is not known. He may have acquired the land from his marriage to Elizabeth, who would have acquired it from her previous marriages or from her parents.

In 1663 Allerton was appointed a justice of then vast Northumberland County (the justices jointly administered the county in addition to judicial duties). In 1667 he was a member of the "Committee of the Association of Northumberland, Westmoreland and Stafford Counties". He joined the local in the Virginia militia  and ultimately rose to the rank of colonel. As a major in 1667, he served under Colonel John Washington, the great-grandfather of president George Washington, Settlers in the area had experienced massacres in 1622 and 1644, and when the southern Maryland Doeg sent a raiding party in 1675 that killed three colonists, the initial response was by Col. George Mason and Captain Giles Brent Jr., who destroyed their Virginia settlement (at Dogue Neck, later a plantation of the Mason family) and pursued them across the river and into the Maryland woods. Then Maryland and Virginia colonists raised a force estimated at 1000 men, the Virginians led by Cols. Washington and Allerton and the Marylanders by Major Truman, to attack a fort the Susquehannocks had erected on an island in the Potomac River. The colonists attacked the fort, and five Native Americans who had surrendered were slaughtered by Maryland militia, which led to charges filed against both Washington and Allerton in the General Court at Williamsburg. Although Washington died before the proceedings finished, Allerton was acquitted.

Allerton first served as a member of the House of Burgesses in 1667, representing Westmoreland County during a break in service of his merchant friend Nicholas Spencer. He would then represent either adjoining Northumberland County, or Westmoreland County for all the sessions in which those Northern Neck counties sent representatives for the next fourteen years.

During Bacon's Rebellion in 1676, Allerton remained loyal to governor Berkeley, who was later criticized by a royal commission. Nathaniel Bacon specifically denounced Allerton as one of the governor's cronies.  Allerton's family also developed a close relationship with the Lee family, who had vast estates in both counties. Like John Washington, both Allerton and Lee were senior officers and also served as members of the General Court of Virginia (the county's appellate court had sessions during those of the House of Burgesses). Allerton and Lee participated in commerce, governmental affairs and social activities.

Allerton served on the Governor's council from 1687 to 1691, when he, Lee and John Armistead resigned rather than take a loyalty oath to William III and Mary II , who had ousted King James. After a decade-plus break in service, Allerton won his last election to the House of Burgesses in 1696, but wrote that illness prevented him from attending to October 1697 session. Nonetheless, he received an appointment as naval officer and tax collector for Westmoreland county in 1699.

Meanwhile, Allerton was on the committee that in 1680 resolved the complicated widow's claim after the execution of rebel Giles Bland, and that year also was appointed escheator (resolving estates of those dying without issue) for Westmoreland or adjacent Northern Neck counties. In 1688, Allerton joined Captain George Brent of Stafford County, Virginia (who had emigrated from Maryland) and Captain Lawrence Washington as trustees of the estate of their mutual friend, Nicholas Spencer; Col. Spencer also bequeathed each man forty shillings for a mourning ring. to serve as trustees of his estates.

Death and legacy
Isaac Allerton died between October 25, 1702, and December 30, 1702, in Westmoreland County, Virginia.

Lee's younger brother Hancock (1652–1709) married Allerton's daughter Sarah (1670–1731) after Hancock's first wife died. They became the great-grandparents of President Zachary Taylor, through their daughter Elizabeth Lee and grandson Colonel Richard Taylor, an officer in the Continental Army in the American Revolutionary War.  Another great granddaughter was Mary Willis Lee (1757–1798), the daughter of Hancock Lee II (1709-1762) and Mary Willis (1716–1766). She married Ambrose Madison (1755–1793). He was the son of James Madison, Sr., the owner of a tobacco plantation in Orange County, Virginia; and the brother of James Madison (March 16, 1751 – June 28, 1836) an American politician and political philosopher who served as the fourth President of the United States (1809–1817) and is considered one of the Founding Fathers of the United States.

Ancestry

Notes

References
Allerton, Walter S. A History of the Allerton Family in the United States 1585 to 1885 Higginson Book Co., 1900.
Billings, Warren M. The Old Dominion in the Seventeenth Century Publisher: UNC Press, 1975 .
Jones, Emma C. Brewster. The Brewster Genealogy, 1566-1907: a Record of the Descendants of William Brewster of the "Mayflower," ruling elder of the Pilgrim church which founded Plymouth Colony in 1620. New York: Grafton Press, 1908.
Lee, Edmund Jennings Lee of Virginia, 1642-1892: Biographical and Genealogical Sketches of the Descendants of Colonel Richard Lee Publisher: Heritage Books, 2008, .
Merrick, Barbara Lambert. William Brewster of the Mayflower and His Descendants for Four Generations, Revised 3rd Edition, Barbara Lambert Merrick, compiler. General Society of Mayflower Descendants, 2000.
Sibley, John Langdon. Biographical Sketches of Graduates of Harvard University, in Cambridge, Massachusetts: 1659-1677 Publisher: University Bookstore, 1881.
Cochran, Charles F. "Early Generations of the Newton Family" (1928–29), Genealogies of Virginia Families from the Virginia Magazine of History and Biography (Baltimore, MD: Genealogical Publishing Co., 1981), vol. 4

Further reading
Jones, Emma C. Brewster. The Brewster Genealogy, 1566-1907: a Record of the Descendants of William Brewster of the "Mayflower," ruling elder of the Pilgrim church which founded Plymouth Colony in 1620. New York: Grafton Press, 1908.
"Life Visits the Mayflower Descendants" Life November 29, 1948: 129–32. ISSN 0024-3019

External links
 The Elder William Brewster Society, A Pilgrim Lineage Society
The Society of the Lees of Virginia
Isaac Allerton at MayflowerHistory.com
Last Will and Testament of Isaac Allerton at The Plymouth Colony Archive Project

1627 births
1702 deaths
17th-century English people
British merchants
People of the Plymouth Colony
British planters
People of colonial Connecticut
Harvard College alumni
House of Burgesses members
Lee family of Virginia
People of colonial Massachusetts
People from Duxbury, Massachusetts
People from Northumberland County, Virginia
People from Plymouth, Massachusetts
People from Westmoreland County, Virginia
Virginia colonial people
Zachary Taylor family